Escarpada Point, also known as Craggy Point (escarpada is Spanish for "craggy"), is the rocky, rugged south-west point of Clarence Island in the South Shetland Islands of Antarctica. The descriptive name was given in the course of Argentine government visits in 1953–1954.

Important Bird Area
The point has been identified as an Important Bird Area (IBA) by BirdLife International because it supports, as well as a large breeding colony of about 10,000 pairs of chinstrap penguins, some 3000 pairs of macaroni penguins and at least 10,000 pairs of southern fulmars.  The point lies 6 km south-west of Chinstrap Cove, another IBA.

References 

Headlands of the South Shetland Islands
Important Bird Areas of Antarctica
Seabird colonies
Penguin colonies